The 2014 World RX of France was the 8th round of the inaugural season of the FIA World Rallycross Championship. The event was held at the Circuit de Lohéac in Loheac, Bretagne.

Heats

Semi-finals

Semi-final 1

Semi-final 2

Final

Championship standings after the event

References

External links

|- style="text-align:center"
|width="35%"|Previous race:2014 World RX of Canada
|width="30%"|FIA World Rallycross Championship2014 season
|width="35%"|Next race:2014 World RX of Germany
|- style="text-align:center"
|width="35%"|Previous race:None
|width="30%"|World RX of France
|width="35%"|Next race:2015 World RX of France
|- style="text-align:center"

France
World RX